Everett F. Shelton (May 12, 1898 – April 16, 1974) was an American basketball coach in the 1940s and 1950s. Shelton played quarterback for the Phillips University football team. The Cunningham, Kansas native coached 46 years at the high school, college and Amateur Athletic Union (AAU) levels and compiled an 850–437 record. He is mostly known for coaching the Wyoming Cowboys men's basketball team from 1939 to 1959. While at Wyoming, Shelton had a record of 328 wins and 201 losses for a .620 winning percentage. He guided the Cowboys to eight Mountain States / Skyline Conference championships and seven NCAA Tournament appearances. During his career, he was President of the National Association of Basketball Coaches.  He was elected to the Naismith Memorial Basketball Hall of Fame in 1980.

Shelton's 1942–43 Wyoming Cowboys basketball team won the fifth NCAA basketball tournament. Shelton nearly won the national championship at Sacramento State College, where his Hornets lost in overtime to Mount St. Mary's in the 1962 NCAA College Division basketball tournament.

Head coaching record

Basketball

Football

See also
 List of NCAA Division I Men's Final Four appearances by coach

References

External links
 

1898 births
1974 deaths
American men's basketball coaches
American men's basketball players
American football quarterbacks
Basketball coaches from Kansas
Basketball players from Kansas
College men's basketball head coaches in the United States
High school basketball coaches in the United States
Naismith Memorial Basketball Hall of Fame inductees
National Collegiate Basketball Hall of Fame inductees
People from Kingman County, Kansas
Phillips Haymakers athletic directors
Phillips Haymakers football coaches
Phillips Haymakers football players
Phillips Haymakers men's basketball coaches
Phillips Haymakers men's basketball players
Wyoming Cowboys and Cowgirls athletic directors
Wyoming Cowboys baseball coaches
Wyoming Cowboys basketball coaches